Britain's Biggest Warship is a British documentary television series about the early sea trials of the Royal Navy's new flagship aircraft carrier, HMS Queen Elizabeth, first broadcast on BBC Two in 2018.

 Crewing Up - 15 April 2018
 In at the Deep End - 22 April 2018
 Out with the Old, in with the New - 29 April 2018

'Britain's Biggest Warship: Goes to Sea' is the second series in the brand.  This three part series shown in the autumn of 2019 tells the story of HMS Queen Elizabeth's four-month deployment to the US to test the F35b Lightning Stealth fighter for the first time.

 Let Go All Lines -  27 October 2019
 Don't Feed the Birds - 3 November 2019
 Manhattan Ahoy!'' - 10 November 2019

References

External links
 
 
 Britain's Biggest Warship at BBC

2010s British documentary television series
2018 British television series debuts
2019 British television series endings
2010s British reality television series
BBC high definition shows
BBC television documentaries
Documentary television series about aviation
English-language television shows
Television series by STV Studios